The Sunshine Protection Act is a proposed United States federal law that would make U.S. daylight saving time permanent, meaning the time would no longer change twice per year.
Despite passage in the Senate, the bill has stalled in the House, where it remained in a committee until the expiration of the previous Congress.

Background

Time zones were first introduced in the United States in 1883 by railroad companies. In 1918, they were codified into federal law by the Standard Time Act, which also included a provision for nationwide daylight saving time modeled after European laws designed to save energy during World War I, but that component was repealed a year later due to protests by farmers. Many states subsequently introduced daylight saving time, and in 1966, the Uniform Time Act standardized the dates when it begins and ends. Hawaii, most of Arizona, and the U.S. territories have opted to observe permanent standard time, but the Uniform Time Act forbids observation of permanent daylight saving time.

The Emergency Daylight Saving Time Energy Conservation Act enacted year-round daylight saving time for a two-year experiment from January 6, 1974 to April 7, 1975, but Congress later ended the experiment early on October 27, 1974, and did not make it permanent due to unfavorable public opinion, especially regarding concerns about dark winter mornings.

In the late 2010s, resolutions were passed in more than 30 states advocating for the federal government to abolish the annual transitions.

Provisions

The Sunshine Protection Act would establish a permanent daylight saving time in the U.S., leading to later sunrises and sunsets during the four months in which most of the U.S. currently observes standard time, resulting in less sunlight in the morning hours and more sunlight in the evening ones. It would not mandate that states and territories that observe permanent standard time (American Samoa, most of Arizona, Guam, Hawaii, Northern Mariana Islands, Puerto Rico, and the Virgin Islands) switch to permanent daylight saving time.

Legislative history

The Sunshine Protection Act was first introduced in 2018 by U.S. senator Marco Rubio, modeled after a 2018 Florida bill of the same name. U.S. president Donald Trump tweeted that he would be willing to sign it, but it failed to advance. A reintroduction in 2019 by Vern Buchanan similarly failed. The 2021 iteration was filed in the U.S. House of Representatives by Buchanan on January 4, 2021, and in the U.S. Senate by Rubio on March 9, 2021, ultimately failing because the 117th Congress ended without the House voting on it.

The bill received bipartisan support, and was cosponsored in the Senate by James Lankford, Roy Blunt, Sheldon Whitehouse, Ron Wyden,; Cindy Hyde-Smith,, Rick Scott, and Ed Markey. It passed the Senate by unanimous consent on March 15, 2022. Two days later, BuzzFeed News reported that many senators were not aware that a request had been made for the bill to pass via unanimous consent and were not ready to raise an objection. Rubio's office had notified every other senator's office of the request; however, it is a frequent occurrence for legislative staff to "vet the request" themselves to "decide if an issue is too benign or obviously doomed to bother their boss with." BuzzFeed identified Tom Cotton as a senator who, according to a member of his staff, was vehemently opposed to the bill and would have objected to its passage had he been informed of it. Upon being passed by the Senate, the bill faced uncertain prospects in the House. Ultimately, the 117th Congress ended without the House voting on the bill.

As of January 3, 2023:

Debate

The debate over the bill mainly concerns the effects on human health, traffic accidents, and whether it is better to have more sunlight in the morning or the evening.

Numerous polls have found that a very high number of Americans believe that a standard time should be fixed and permanent—as many as 75% favor no longer changing clocks twice per year—however there is no consensus on whether the desired fixed time should be daylight saving time or standard time. One of the most common arguments among researchers of varying backgrounds is that the change itself causes most of the negative effects, more so than either standard time or daylight saving time. Researchers have observed numerous ill effects of the annual transitions, including reduced worker productivity, increased heart attacks and strokes, increased medical errors, and increased traffic incidents. 

Opponents of the Sunshine Protection Act argue permanent standard time would be more beneficial to health and human welfare. Numerous health specialists, safety experts, and research societies consider permanent standard time better for health, safety, schools, and the economy. This happens partly because standard time aligns with the natural circadian cycle, whereas daylight saving time is an hour ahead. The closer harmony between standard time and biology contributes to safer morning commutes, improved student welfare, practicability of certain religious practices (such as in Orthodox Judaism and Islam), increased exposure to healthy morning sunlight, and higher productivity and wages. However, advocates of permanent daylight saving time argue it has its own benefits including decreased crime, less frequent traffic incidents, and decreased prevalence of seasonal depression. Research is unclear about which time setting conserves more energy.

References

External links
 Sunshine Protection Act at Congress.gov
 Sunshine Protection Act at GovTrack

Daylight saving time in the United States
Proposed legislation of the 115th United States Congress
Proposed legislation of the 116th United States Congress
Proposed legislation of the 117th United States Congress